Abdulla Baba Fatadi (born 2 November 1985) is a former footballer who played as a midfielder. Born as Babatunde Fatai in Lagos, Nigeria, he represented Bahrain at international level.

International goals

References

External links
football.ch Profile

1985 births
Living people
Naturalized citizens of Bahrain
Nigerian footballers
Bahraini footballers
Neuchâtel Xamax FCS players
Nigerian expatriate sportspeople in Bahrain
Nigerian expatriate sportspeople in Switzerland
Bahraini expatriate sportspeople in Switzerland
Swiss Super League players
Expatriate footballers in Bahrain
Al Kharaitiyat SC players
Mesaimeer SC players
Al-Ittihad Kalba SC players
2007 AFC Asian Cup players
2011 AFC Asian Cup players
Al-Shoulla FC players
Footballers at the 2006 Asian Games
Al-Markhiya SC players
UAE Pro League players
Saudi Professional League players
Qatari Second Division players
Qatar Stars League players
Association football midfielders
Asian Games competitors for Bahrain
Bahraini expatriate sportspeople in Saudi Arabia
Expatriate footballers in Saudi Arabia
Bahrain international footballers
Nigerian expatriate sportspeople in Qatar
Nigerian expatriate sportspeople in Kuwait
Nigerian expatriate sportspeople in Saudi Arabia
Bahraini expatriate sportspeople in Qatar
Bahraini expatriate sportspeople in Kuwait